Aquakultre is a Canadian soul and R&B musical project from Halifax, Nova Scotia, whose core member is singer and rapper Lance Sampson. They are most noted for their album Legacy, which was a longlisted nominee for the 2020 Polaris Music Prize.

Sampson's ancestors are from Africville, and he grew up in the Uniacke Square neighbourhood of Halifax. He was a troubled teenager, who spent some time trafficking drugs and received a five-year prison sentence as a teenager. After being exposed to the music of Common and Erykah Badu, he taught himself to play guitar, and was released from prison after just 19 months for good behaviour. He began performing as a rapper and singer in 2015, and in 2018 he won CBC Music's annual Searchlight competition with "Sure", a song he had written in prison. 

He recorded Legacy in just seven days at the National Music Centre in Calgary, Alberta, with a band that included Nathan Doucet, Jeremy Costello and Nick Dourado. Following the release of preview singles "Pay It Forward", "I Doubt It" and "Wife Tonight", the album was released in May 2020 on Black Buffalo Records.

In August 2020, he announced that his second album Bleeding Gums Murphy, a collaboration with DJ and producer Uncle Fester, would be released on October 9. 

His video for "Pay It Forward", directed by Sampson and Evan Elliot, won the Audience Award at the 2021 Prism Prize.

Aquakultre performed on the 2021 FreeUp! The Emancipation Day Special. He contributed vocals for "Summer Night Songs", the title song of the 2021 documentary The North Star: Finding Black Mecca.

His third album, Don't Trip, was released in July 2022.

References

Canadian contemporary R&B musical groups
Canadian soul music groups
Canadian hip hop groups
Musical groups from Halifax, Nova Scotia
21st-century Black Canadian male singers
Black Nova Scotians